Kahramanmaraş Province is a province of Turkey. Its provincial capital is the city of Kahramanmaraş, the traffic code is 46.

Geography
Making up 1.83 % of Turkey's land area, Kahramanmaraş is traversed by the northeasterly line of equal latitude and longitude. 
The majority of the province with around 60% of the total area is covered with mountains, being followed by plateaus and plains. Most of the mountains in the province is part of the Southeastern Taurus Mountain range. Due to the low tree line most of the highest areas are bare, but lower regions have forests.

Southern parts of the province has a hot-summer type Mediterranean climate (Csa), including the administrative center of Kahramanmaraş. Northern parts of the province show the characteristics of a continental climate (Dsa and Dsb). At the northernmost parts of the province lays the Elbistan Plain, where the town and district of Elbistan is located. It has a cold semi arid climate.

Ceyhan River is the most important river in the province. Lake Kumaşır, along with some small crater lakes on the Nurhak and Ahir mountains makes the only natural body of water in the province, though there are multiple dam reservoirs such as Dam Lake Menzelet.

Districts

Kahramanmaraş province is divided into 10 districts (İlçe):
Kahramanmaraş (Central district, soon to be split into Dulkadiroğlu and Onikişubat)
Afşin
Andırın
Çağlayancerit
Ekinözü
Elbistan
Göksun
Nurhak
Pazarcık
Türkoğlu

Health
Air pollution in Turkey is a persistent issue and has been linked to the usage of coal-fired power plants, such as the Afşin-Elbistan power stations.

Economy

Kahramanmaraş has historically been famous for its gold. The textile industry in Kahramanmaraş has only recently developed and mainly operates through the use of machinery.

Education

The Kahramanmaraş Sütçü İmam University is a recently founded university supplying social, language and technical sciences as well as medical education.

Cuisine

The province's most famous culinary specialty is Dondurma, also called "Maraş ice cream", available in specialist Ice Cream shops throughout Turkey. The ice cream has an elastic consistency and is served with knife and fork, often accompanied by a slice of baklava. It melts in the mouth while chewed, with a consistency similar to bubble gum.

Maraş red peppers are also well known for its aroma, Vitamin C content, and moderate hotness. Maraş pepper is different from far-east chilies as dried with support of Scientific Investigations and Universities which contains no aflatoxin and no diseases.

See also 
Düzbağ

References

External links 
 Kahramanmaraş Weather Forecast Information
 Kahramanmaraş City Portal
 Kahramanmaraş News

 
Towns of Ottoman Syria